Baranomys kowalskii is extinct species of rodent, from the Baranomys genus of the Baranomyinae subfamily, of the Cricetidae family. It lived in Europe during Pliocene epoch, 15 million years ago, being one of the oldest known members of Baranomys family. It was an ancestor of modern Arvicolinae. The animal had been described by Miklós Kretzoi in 1959, who based his research on the fossils found near Podlesice village in Poland. It was named after a paleontologist and zoologist Kazimierz Kowalski.

References 

Cricetidae
Pliocene mammals of Europe
Prehistoric rodents
Animals described in 1959